Minakari or Meenakari is the process of painting and colouring the surfaces of metals and ceramic tiles through enameling originating in Safavid Iran.  It is practiced as an art form and commercially produced mainly in Iran, India, Afghanistan, Pakistan. Minakari art usually involves intricate designs (mainly using geometric shapes and designs) and is applied as a decorative feature to serving dishes, containers, vases, frames, display ornaments and jewelry.

Etymology

The word Mīnākārī is a compound word composed of the words mina and kari.  Mīnā is a feminine variation of the word mīnū which means paradise or heaven.  Kārī means to do or place something onto something else.  Together the word Mīnākārī means to place paradise onto an object.

History

The art of enameling metal for ornamental reasons has been traced back to the Parthian and Sassanid period of Iranian history. However the meticulous ornamental work seen today can be traced back to Safavid Iran around the 15th century.  The Moghuls introduced it into India and perfected the technique making the design applied on objects more intricate.  The craft reached its peak in Iran during the eighteenth and nineteenth century. In the twentieth century Iranian artisans specializing in meenakari were invited to other regions to assist with training local craftsmen. In India Rajasthan and Gujarat are most famous for their Mīnākārī artifacts and jewelry.

Process

The process usually includes the fusing of coloured powder glass onto a substrate (metal, glass or ceramics) through intense heat (usually between 750 and 850 degrees Celsius or 1382 and 1562 degrees Fahrenheit).  The powder melts and cures to a smooth, durable glassy coating on metal, glass or ceramics.

See also
 Arts of Iran

References

Ceramic art
Iranian art
Vitreous enamel